The Five Dollar Baby is a 1922 American silent comedy film directed by Harry Beaumont and starring Viola Dana, Ralph Lewis and Otto Hoffman. A family hock their baby to a pawnbroker for five dollars.

Cast
 Viola Dana as Ruth 
 Ralph Lewis as Ben Shapinsky 
 Otto Hoffman as The Solitary Kid 
 John Harron as Larry Donovan 
 Tom McGuire as Mr. Donovan 
 Arthur Rankin as Bernie Riskin 
 Marjorie Maurice as Esther Block 
 Ernest Pasque as Isadore

References

Bibliography
 Munden, Kenneth White. The American Film Institute Catalog of Motion Pictures Produced in the United States, Part 1. University of California Press, 1997.

External links

1922 films
Silent American comedy films
Films directed by Harry Beaumont
American silent feature films
1920s English-language films
Metro Pictures films
American black-and-white films
1922 comedy films
1920s American films